Victor Collot, in full Georges Henri Victor Collot (21 March 1750 – 15 May 1805), was a French military officer who served in the New World in various capacities, among them as Governor of Guadeloupe.

He is best known for his expedition down the Ohio and Mississippi rivers in the spring and summer of 1796. The French ambassador to the United States, assigned him his mission.  French authorities believed some settlers in the region were French sympathizers.  France and the United States engaged in an undeclared "quasi war", at sea, two years later.

Collot started his expedition in Philadelphia.  He triggered scrutiny, right from the beginning, and was shadowed by Zebulon Pike. 

Pike arrested Collot, at Fort Massac, Illinois, but had to release him as there was no charges that could be laid against him. 

Collot traveled through very lightly settled territories. France had ceded Louisiana, and all the Mississippi basin west of the Mississippi itself to Spain.  Following the American Revolution the eastern branches of the Mississippi was American territory.

He made maps and observed fortifications and the country's military preparedness, almost certainly on a secret mission on behalf of the French Republic. He had been watched during his progress, however, and on arriving in New Orleans he was almost immediately arrested by Carondelet, the Spanish governor, on October 27, and placed in custody at the Balize until he could be sent out of the colony on December 4. Gen. Collot published an account of this expedition under the title "Voyage dans l'Amérique Septentrionale". He also authored a "Mémoire sur les moyens de soumettre les rebelles de St. Dominique", a proposal for subjugating the rebels of San Domingo.

His account of his travels was translated into English and published in 1826.

In March 2017 the Kentucky Gateway Museum Center celebrated purchasing two of Collot's maps, maps of Kentucky.  When describing the purchase the Kentucky Herald-Leader called Collot "an excellent mapmaker but a lousy spy."

One of the maps was “The Course of the Ohio from its Source to its Junction with the Mississippi.”  It was purchased from a private collector.  The other map was a map of Kentucky.  Most of Collot's other maps were of rivers, or riverports, while the second map purchase was of the overland route between Maysville to Lexington.

Notes

Further reading

External links
 
 Collot's American Expedition and his Arrest in Louisiana
Voyage dans l'Amérique septentrionale
John Cushman Abbott Exhibit Supplement—includes a discussion of Collot and his Voyage dans l'Amérique Septentrionale, a slide show of illustrations, and 3 downloadable pdf files of the 2-volume book plus atlas.

1750 births
1805 deaths
French generals
History of Guadeloupe
People of pre-statehood Illinois
People of Colonial Spanish Louisiana
French colonial governors of Guadeloupe